Believe It or Not is a 1983 Soviet comedy film directed by Sergei Ovcharov.

Plot 
The film is based on the story Divers by V. Shishkov, Russian legends, songs, tales and ditties, and tells about the slack Neznam, the village inventor Bobyl and the brave Soldier.

Cast 
 Aleksandr Kuznetsov as Neznam
 Aleksey Buldakov
 Sergey Bekhterev		
 Igor Ivanov
 Nina Usatova as Neznam's Wife
 Margarita Matveyeva
 Vyacheslav Polunin	
 Nikolai Terentyev	
 Valery Zakharyev	
 I. Alyoshina

References

External links 
 

1983 films
1980s Russian-language films
Soviet comedy films
1983 comedy films